Protarache is a genus of moths of the family Noctuidae. The genus was erected by George Hampson in 1910.

Species
Protarache annulata Wileman & West, 1929 Philippines (Luzon)
Protarache eulepidea (Hampson, 1896) Sri Lanka
Protarache polygrapha Berio, 1950 Eritrea

References

External links
 "Genus Protarache". Insecta.pro

Acontiinae